Materials Science and Engineering: B — Advanced Functional Solid-State Materials  is a peer-reviewed scientific journal. It is the section of Materials Science and Engineering dedicated to "calculation, synthesis, processing, characterization, and understanding of advanced quantum materials" and is published monthly by Elsevier. It aims at providing a leading international forum for material researchers across the disciplines of theory, experiment, and device applications. Current editor-in-chief is Jing Xia (University of California Irvine).

According to the Journal Citation Reports, the journal has a 2021 impact factor of 3.407.

References

External links
 

Physics review journals
Materials science journals
Elsevier academic journals
Publications established in 1993
English-language journals
Monthly journals